The Alum Rock Union School District (abbreviated ARUSD) operates nineteen elementary schools (K-5) and seven middle schools (6–8) in the greater San Jose, California area in the United States.

The district closed Grandin Miller Elementary School in 2004,
Pala Middle School in 2010, In 1996, there was an incident that occurred in the back of Clyde L. Fischer Middle School, when Santiago Chavez got into an argument with Roger Dale Williams behind the school, stabbing Williams. He died from his injuries.

See also
Alum Rock, California

References

External links
 

School districts in Santa Clara County, California
San Francisco Bay Area-related lists